Pet is the debut album by New Zealand rock band, Fur Patrol, released on 24 September 2000.

Chart performance
Pet debuted on the New Zealand Albums Chart on 29 October 2000 at number fourteen, before peaking the next week at number seven. After six weeks in the chart, it slipped out of the top fifty. The release of the second single, "Lydia", prompted the album to re-enter the chart at number forty-four on 17 December 2000. Pet spent a total of thirty weeks in the chart.

Singles
Pet spawned five singles. "Now" and "Holy", the album's first two singles, were not commercially successful, failing to appear on any record chart. The third single, "Lydia", went to number-one on the New Zealand Singles Chart on 24 December 2000, succeeding "Independent Women Part I" by Destiny's Child. The song spent one week in the top spot, knocked off by the Backstreet Boys' "Shape of My Heart". "Lydia" spent nineteen weeks in the chart. "Andrew" (which was initially called "Sorry" on the media reference CD of 4/5/2000) peaked at number twenty-four on the singles chart, spending a total of fifteen weeks there, while "Spinning a Line", the album's fifth and final single, spent three weeks in the New Zealand Singles Chart, peaking at number forty.

Track listing
All songs written by Julia Deans, Andrew Bain, Simon Braxton, and Steve Wells.

 "Andrew" - 3:46
 "Holy" - 2:55
 "Now" - 3:04
 "Loaded" - 5:44
 "Lydia" - 4:15
 "Hauling You Around" - 5:44
 "Not Your Girl" - 5:46
 "Spinning a Line" - 5:05
 "Two Days" - 3:51
 "Brightest Star" - 4:00
 "Short Way To Fall" - 5:48
 "Man In A Box" - 4:57 (2 minutes and 3 seconds of silence follows)
 "Bottles And Jars" (hidden track) - 8:25
Source: Bandcamp

Personnel

 Andrew Bain - bass, keyboards
 Simon Braxton - drums, percussion, theremin, vocals
 Julia Deans - guitar, violin, vocals
 Mike Gibson - recording
 Sam Gibson - mastering, audio mixing
 Steve King - assistant photography
 David Long - production
 Becky Nunes - photography
 Steve Smart - mastering
 Jade Weaver - artwork
 Andrew B. White - artwork
 Steven Wells - guitar, vocals

Source: Discogs

Notes

References

2000 debut albums
Fur Patrol albums